Canned Funk is a jazz album by Joe Farrell for CTI Records. It was recorded at Van Gelder Studios November and December 1974. The album was released in 1975.

Track listing

Side one
 "Canned Funk" (Joe Farrell) – 7:20
 "Animal" (Farrell) – 9:55

Side two
 "Suite Martinique" (Farrell) – 9:03 	
 "Spoken Silence" (Farrell) – 7:43

Personnel
Joe Farrell – tenor saxophone, soprano saxophone, baritone saxophone, flute
Herb Bushler – bass
Joe Beck – guitar
Jimmy Madison – drums
Ray Mantilla – conga, percussion

Recording credits
Producer - Creed Taylor
Cover photograph – Pete Turner
Liner photograph – Sheila Metzner
Album design – Bob Ciano

Chart performance

References

External links

1975 albums
CTI Records albums
Joe Farrell albums
Albums produced by Creed Taylor
Albums recorded at Van Gelder Studio